Subconscious Lobotomy is the debut album of Swedish death metal band Centinex. The album was received with generally positive reviews. The original cd version was only pressed to 1000 copies worldwide.

Track listing

Personnel
Andreas Evaldsson - Guitar 
Joakim Gustavsson - Drums 
Erik Håkansson - Vocals 
Martin Schulman - Bass 
Mattias Lamppu - Vocals

1992 debut albums
Centinex albums